Jun Li (born 3 August 1991) is a Hong Kong film director and screenwriter. Li made his feature film debut with Tracey in 2018. He won the Golden Horse Award for Best Adapted Screenplay at the 58th Golden Horse Awards in November 2021 for his second film Drifting.

Early life 
Li was born in London and grew up in Hong Kong. Li originally studied architecture at the University of Hong Kong but later dropped out. He then studied journalism and communications at Chinese University of Hong Kong. After graduation, he worked as a television reporter. He later quit to obtain his Master of Philosophy in gender studies at the University of Cambridge. He then moved back to Hong Kong and worked at the University of Hong Kong as a research assistant.

Career 
Li began making short films as a research assistant under Petula Ho at the University of Hong Kong. He and his short film Liu Yang He (2017) won the Fresh Wave Award and Best Director at the Fresh Wave International Short Film Festival.

Li made his feature film debut with Tracey in 2018 about a married trans woman transitioning in her 50s. Li was brought on later in pre-production, after another director quit the project and actors Philip Keung and River Huang have been cast. He was nominated at the 38th Hong Kong Film Awards for Best Screenplay (alongside Shu Kei and Erica Li) and Best New Director.  Li has not received a Hong Kong government subsidy (such as the First Feature Film Initiative) for all his feature productions. He cited the lack of perceived commercial viability of LGBT films as a barrier to winning such initiatives.

His second film Drifting (2021) is about homelessness and addiction in Sham Shui Po, Kowloon. It competed at the International Film Festival Rotterdam Big Screen Competition. The film was nominated for 12 awards at the 58th Golden Horse Awards, making it the most nominated film from that year. He was himself nominated Best Director, Best Film Editing and Best Adapted Screenplay, winning the latter.

Style and influences 
Li cites Ken Loach, Spike Lee, Stanley Kwan, and Ann Hui as his influences.

Personal life 
Li is gay.

Filmography

Directing, Writing, Editing, Producing

Acting

Awards and accolades

See also 

 Heiward Mak, Hong Kong director, co-editor on Drifting (2021)

References 

Hong Kong film directors
Alumni of the Chinese University of Hong Kong
Alumni of the University of Cambridge
Hong Kong LGBT screenwriters
LGBT film directors
Hong Kong screenwriters
Gay screenwriters
1991 births
Living people